Joe Kennedy Jr. (1923 – April 17, 2004) was an American jazz violinist and educator. Kennedy was born in Pittsburgh, Pennsylvania. He performed and recorded with pianist Ahmad Jamal and was director of jazz studies at Virginia Tech from 1984 to 1995. Kennedy performed with Benny Carter, Toots Thielemans, Billy Taylor, and the Modern Jazz Quartet and appeared at major international jazz festivals including the North Sea Jazz Festival and Monterey Jazz Festival.

Discography

As leader
 Strings by Candlelight (Red Anchor, 1962)
 Magnifique! (Black and Blue, 1980)
 Accentuate the Positive with Toots Thielemans (Consolidate Artists, 1998)

As sideman
With Ahmad Jamal
 Listen to the Ahmad Jamal Quintet (Argo, 1960)
 Big Byrd: The Essence Part 2 (Verve, 1997)
 Ahmad Jamal a Paris (WEA, 1999)

With John Lewis
 Kansas City Breaks (Finesse, 1982)

With Billy Taylor
 Where've You Been? (Concord Jazz, 1981)

Sources
 
 

1923 births
2004 deaths
American jazz violinists
American male violinists
20th-century American violinists
20th-century American male musicians
American male jazz musicians
Black & Blue Records artists